Yüce is a Turkish surname. Notable people with the surname include:

İhsan Yüce (1929–1991), Turkish actor, scenarist, and director
Merter Yüce (born 1985), Turkish footballer
Sedat Yüce (born 1976), Turkish singer

Turkish-language surnames